Nagarathil Samsara Vishayam (Malayalam: നഗരത്തില്‍ സംസാര വിഷയം, English: The Talk of the Town) is a 1991 Malayalam comedy-thriller film written by Kaloor Dennis, directed by Prashanth. It stars Jagadish, Siddique, Chithra and Keerikkadan Jose in the lead roles. This is one of the low budget comedy films were produced following the success of In Harihar Nagar  with  Jagadish and Siddique in the lead role.

Plot

Gopinatha Menon (Jagadish) is an unemployed youth living off his family with aspirations of becoming a film star. He is in love with Saritha (Geetha Vijayan), his cousin, but the relationship is vehemently opposed by the families. He joins as his friend Samson's (Siddique) assistant in his job as a film representative in a struggling film distribution company, Akamsha Films run by Pappi (Kuthiravattam Pappu) and Krishnankutty (Baiju Santhosh)

On their first trip to a rural cinema hall, they get hold of a box full of currency when their film roll box get swapped by accident. The pair decides to keep the fortune to themselves, but a gang of goons arrives looking for the lost money. They manage to escape stealing a scooter while the money is hidden in the bushes. They meet Susan (Chithra), an old aquintence of Samson who is working as a singer at the five star hotel the pair run into. With the help of Susan they manage to retrieve the sack of money, but it turns out to be swapped with the dead body of Pappi, projector operator at the cinema. The pair is dragged into another possible murder when Susan stabs the hotel manager who tries to rape her. Susan joins them on the run carrying Pappi's body as they steal another car from the hotel.

Vikraman (Keerikkadan Jose), an underground hawala agent is still in the lookout for his box with 40 lakhs of hawala money. He engages his nephew, Sundaresan to lead the search operation.

Cast 
 Jagadish as Gopinatha Menon
 Siddique as Samson
 Chithra as Susan
 Baiju as Krishnankutty
 Keerikkadan Jose as Vikraman
 Zainuddin as Sundareshan
 Kuthiravattam Pappu as Pappi
 Jagannatha Varma as Achutha Menon
 Geetha Vijayan as Saritha
 Thodupuzha Vasanthi as Bharathi	
 Innocent as Gap Swamy
KPAC Sunny as Saritha's father
Valsala Menon as Saritha's mother
 Unnimary as Subhashini
 Shivaji as Alex		
 Viji Thampi as himself
 Suma Jayaram as herself
Santhakumari

References

External links
 

1991 films
1990s Malayalam-language films
Films directed by Thevalakkara Chellappan